Canton Township is one of the seventeen townships of Stark County, Ohio, United States.  The 2000 census found 13,882 people in the township, 13,402 of whom lived in the unincorporated portions of the township.

Geography
Located in the central part of the county, it borders the following townships:
Plain Township - north
Nimishillen Township - northeast corner
Osnaburg Township - east
Sandy Township - southeast corner
Pike Township - south
Bethlehem Township - southwest corner
Perry Township - west
Jackson Township - northwest corner

The city of Canton, the county seat of Stark County, occupies much of northern Canton Township.  A small area around the northwest corner of the township remains outside of the city of Canton, and part of this area is occupied by part of the village of Meyers Lake.  The unincorporated communities of North Industry and Waco are located in the southern and central parts of the township, respectively.

Name and history
It is the only Canton Township statewide.

Canton Township was described in 1833 as having five gristmills, nine saw mills, four fulling mills, six tanneries, nineteen stores, one oil mill and one blast furnace.

Government
The township is governed by a three-member board of trustees, who are elected in November of odd-numbered years to a four-year term beginning on the following January 1. Two are elected in the year after the presidential election and one is elected in the year before it. There is also an elected township fiscal officer, who serves a four-year term beginning on April 1 of the year after the election, which is held in November of the year before the presidential election. Vacancies in the fiscal officer position or on the board of trustees are filled by the remaining trustees.  As of 2022, the trustees are Chris Nichols, Mark Shaffer, and Keith Hochadel, and the fiscal officer is John Ring.

Education
Students attend Canton Local Schools. The high school for this district is Canton South High School.

References

External links
Township website
County website
Canton Local School District

Townships in Stark County, Ohio
Townships in Ohio